Zdravko Stankov (born 1 April 1977) is a former Bulgarian footballer who played as a defender.

References

Bulgarian footballers
1977 births
Living people
Footballers from Plovdiv
Association football defenders
First Professional Football League (Bulgaria) players
PFC Lokomotiv Plovdiv players
PFC Cherno More Varna players
PFC Pirin Blagoevgrad players
PFC Belasitsa Petrich players
PFC Rodopa Smolyan players
Botev Plovdiv players
PFC Lokomotiv Mezdra players
PFC Vidima-Rakovski Sevlievo players